Tara Tiny is an electric car manufactured by India's Tara International, an arm of Bengal Enamel, in association with China's Aucma.

Its assembly line is located in Kolkata, West Bengal. Production started in 2008, and is still operating.

The Tiny is rumoured to be the world's least expensive car, priced at Rs. 99,999 (approx USD 2,450), which is less than that of Tata Nano. However, due to new models in the market it is possible that this information may be incorrect.

The Tiny is be battery operated, providing  at 50-70 paise (Rs. .50-.70).

Tara International projects the launch of three other versions of the car: Tara Titu, Tara Micro and Tara Mini., proposes to import 60-70% components from China and manufacture the remainder in India.

Specifications of Tara Tiny are as follows:

No of seats: 4 
Net weight:  
Wheelbase:  
Maximum speed:  
Maximum grade ability: 15% 
Motor power:  
Battery voltage: 6V*10 
Recharge duration: 8 hours 
Driving charge: 120 km 
Ground clearance: 150 mm 
Running cost: 40 paise/km 
Battery capacity: 200 Ah

See also 
Tata Nano
REVAi

References 

City cars
Electric concept cars
Cars introduced in 2008
Microcars